René François Lacôte (1785–1871) was a Romantic guitar luthier from Paris, France. His guitars were played by guitarists such as Fernando Sor, Ferdinando Carulli, Dionisio Aguado,  Napoléon Coste, and Marco Aurelio Zani de Ferranti. Musicologist René Vannes referred to Lacôte as the "Stradivarius of the guitar" in his book Universal Dictionary of Luthiers. Lacôte apprenticed to the luthier Joseph Pons. Ferndando Sor mentioned in his book Méthode pour la Guitare that "M. Lacote, a French maker, the only person who, besides his talents, has proved to me that he possesses the quality of not being inflexible to reasoning".

Gallery

References 

1785 births
1855 deaths
Date of birth missing
Date of death missing
Place of death missing
Luthiers from Paris
Classical guitar makers
19th-century French businesspeople